The Nordhausen University of Applied Sciences is located in Nordhausen, Thuringia, Germany. Established in 1997 after reunification of Germany, as of 2021 the Hochschule has 2,212 students enrolled and 50 professors. It offers Bachelor's and Master's degrees in business administration, public management, and business engineering, among others.

External links

Official website

Universities and colleges in Thuringia
Nordhausen, Thuringia
Universities of Applied Sciences in Germany